Thilo von Westernhagen (14 January 1950 – 11 January 2014) was a German composer and pianist.

Biography 
Thilo von Westernhagen was born on 14 January 1950 in Preetz, Schleswig-Holstein. His father, Wolfgang von Westernhagen, was a dentist. He was a member of the von Westernhagen family, who were part of the German minor nobility. He attended the University of Kiel where he studied dentistry before switching to music. He composed classical music and jazz music. He also composed scores for the 1980 television film Geheime Mission, the 1981 television films  and Beate und Mareile, the 1982 film , the 1986 television film Storm, der Schimmelreiter, and for two episodes of the television crime series Tatort. He married Monika Borchfeldt and had two daughters. He died on 11 January 2014 in Lübeck.

References 

 Musik: Komponist Thilo von Westernhagen gestorben, Focus Online, Meldung 13 January 2014, retrieved 13 January 2014
 Thilo von Westernhagen, RC Grevesmühlen Jazzkomponist und Wagner-Fan.

External links
 

1950 births
2014 deaths
20th-century German composers
21st-century German composers
German classical pianists
Male classical pianists
German jazz pianists
German pianists
German male pianists
German film score composers
German jazz composers
German classical composers
German male classical composers
German untitled nobility
People from Preetz
University of Kiel alumni
Thilo
21st-century German male musicians
20th-century German male musicians
20th-century jazz composers
21st-century jazz composers